The Gardena Office of Economic Development's purpose is to attract new business, and to stimulate job creation by providing services to businesses and industries relocating to or expanding within Gardena, California.

Business outreach
Gardena is a small, highly urbanized community of  within the South Bay Basin of Los Angeles County, United States,  from downtown Los Angeles. Gardena has 62,000 inhabitants. Nearly 40% of the inhabitants age 25 and older have four years or more of college.

Together with the Gardena Employment and Training Center staff, the city has a business outreach program designed to identify attraction and expansion possibilities.

Going Green
The City of Gardena and Office of Economic Development offer programs targeted toward becoming environmentally conscious:
 South Bay Energy Savings Center to help businesses go green
 Southern California Edison program that helps make equipment and operational changes that can lower the monthly electric bill for businesses
 Express Efficiency program that helps businesses apply for rebates on the purchase and installation of equipment to improve energy efficiency
 Standard Performance Contract for large businesses offering financial incentives to offset the capital cost of installing new high efficiency equipment or systems, as well as offering training workshops

The City of Gardena and Office of Economic Development has, in conjunction with the EPA, created a Brownfield Program. The program identifies potentially contaminated properties within the city having the greatest potential for revitalization and redevelopment. Prior to 2009, the EPA awarded the City of Gardena $750,000 in Brownfield Environmental Assessment funds to be used for Environmental Site Assessments. The city discovered 72 Brownfield sites, created nearly 300 construction and clean jobs and leveraged $14 million in clean up funds in partnership with private investments. In October 2009, the EPA awarded to the City of Gardena an additional $400,000 environmental assessment grant.

Rosecrans Revitalization Program
The Rosecrans Revitalization Program is a program that was implemented by the city in 1999. The Rosecrans Corridor is a prime commercial area and the city has embarked on a revitalization to create a commercial environment. The goal of the Rosecrans Corridor program is to stimulate development projects and to make a contribution to the economic revitalization of the City of Gardena.

Business and industry
Gardena is home to over 175 manufacturing businesses offering services and support to the aerospace industry, and is the hub of numerous companies in the metalworking and machinery, food processing and furniture industries. Some of the city's largest employers include; HITCO Carbon Composites (2010 “Gardena Outstanding Business Award” winner), Chromalloy Corporation, Crenshaw Lumber Company, Southwest Offset Printing, and national retail credit companies.

References

External links
City of Gardena, California official website
Gardena Economic Development

Gardena, California
Economic development organizations in the United States